During the decennial England and Wales Censuses of 1841 to 1901, the individual schedules returned from each household were transcribed and collated by the census enumerators into Census Enumerators’ Books (CEBs).

It is these CEBs that are used by researchers in the fields of social science, local and family history etc.

Their contents changed over time.

Area Descriptions at the head of each page
1841
City or Borough of
Parish or Township of
1851
Parish or Township of
Ecclesiastical District of
City or Borough of
Town of
Village of
1861
Parish or Township of
City or Municipal Borough of
Municipal Ward of
Parliamentary Borough of
Town of
Hamlet or Tithing of
Ecclesiastical District of
1871
Civil Parish (or Township) of
 City or Municipal Borough of
 Municipal Ward of
Parliamentary Borough of
Town of
Village or Hamlet of
Local Board (or Improvement Commissioner’s District) of
1881
Civil Parish (or Township) of
City or Municipal Borough of
 Municipal Ward of
Parliamentary Borough of
Town or Village or Hamlet of
Urban Sanitary District of
Rural Sanitary District of
Ecclesiastical Parish or District of
1891
Administrative County of
Civil Parish of
Municipal Borough of
Municipal Ward of
Urban Sanitary District of
Town or Village or Hamlet of
Rural Sanitary District of
Parliamentary Borough or Division of
Ecclesiastical Parish or District of

Structure of CEB
Number of Householder’s Schedule
In 1841, if present at all, this was written in the margin
Place (1841) otherwise Name of Street, Place or Road, and Name or No. of House
From 1851 to 1901 this column’s description varied somewhat
Houses Inhabited, Uninhabited or Building
Not in 1851
Number of Rooms Occupied if less than 5
1891 only
Name and Surname of each Person who abode in the house on the night of 
Similar wording throughout
Relation to Head of Family
Not in 1841
Condition - i.e. Single, Married, Widowed etc.
Not in 1841
Age and Sex
In 1841 ages of adults were normally rounded down to the next lowest 5 e.g. 21 => 20, 29 => 25
Occupation
Wording changed over time
Employed, Employer, or Own Account
In 1891 and 1901 (different wording in 1891)
Where born
In 1841 whether born in the county, Scotland, Ireland, or Foreign Parts
Whether deaf-and-dumb, blind, imbecile, idiot, or lunatic
Not in 1841
 Language spoken
 Wales only, from 1891. With "children under 3 years of age to be excluded" in parentheses in 1901

Examples

References 

Demographics of the United Kingdom
Genealogy
Censuses in the United Kingdom
Demographic history of the United Kingdom